Walter Van Rensselaer Berry (July 29, 1859 – October 12, 1927) was an American lawyer, diplomat, Francophile, and friend of several great writers. He was also an American tennis player active in the late 19th century.

Biography
Berry was born in Paris, a descendant of the Van Rensselaer family of New York. After attending St. Mark's School and Harvard, he took a law degree at Columbia University, practicing law in New York City, Washington, D.C., and Paris, where he pursued a career in international law and diplomacy.  After serving as a judge at the International Tribunal of Egypt from 1908 to 1911, he settled in Paris for the remainder of his life and became a strong advocate of France, tirelessly promoting its cause in the United States when World War I broke out in 1914; he served as President of the American Chamber of Commerce in Paris from 1916 to 1923.  After the war he vigorously opposed both Germany and the Soviet Union.

A close friend of Henry James and Edith Wharton, who called him "the love of my life," he met Marcel Proust in the summer of 1916, beginning "a friendship that was to be one of the most rewarding of Proust's final years."

He was a cousin of Harry Crosby, leaving him in his will "my entire library except such items as my good friend Edith Wharton may care to choose."

Tennis
Berry reached the semifinals of the U.S. National Championships in 1885 and the finals of the doubles in 1884. His doubles partner was his cousin, Alexander Van Rensselaer.

References

External links
Walter Berry Papers, 1885-1927 at Southern Illinois University Carbondale, Special Collections Research Center

1859 births
1927 deaths
American people of World War I
St. Mark's School (Massachusetts) alumni
Harvard University alumni
Columbia Law School alumni
American male tennis players